Ulan Hua or Wulanhua ( Улан Хуа ) is the county seat of the Siziwang Banner (Dorbod Banner) in Inner Mongolia. The town is often incorrectly referred to as Siziwang, but Wulanhua is the correct name, Siziwang being the name of county it is in. It is the main transport hub for the region, and a necessary stop for independent travelling by public transport further north to the Gegentala area.

Wulanhua has a population of 36645 according to the 5th census, carried out in the year 2000.

References 

Township-level divisions of Inner Mongolia
Ulanqab